The following is an outline of 1980 in spaceflight.

Launches

|colspan="8"|

January 

|-

|colspan="8"|

February 

|-

|colspan="8"|

March 
|-

|colspan="8"|

April 

|-

|colspan="8"|

May 

|-

|colspan="8"|

June 

|-

|colspan="8"|

July 

|-

|colspan="8"|

August 

|-

|colspan="8"|

September 

|-

|colspan="8"|

October 

|-

|colspan="8"|

November 

|-

|colspan="8"|

December 

|-

|}

Deep Space Rendezvous

Orbital launch summary

By country

By rocket

By family

By type

By configuration

By launch site

By orbit

References

Footnotes

 
Spaceflight by year